The S/V Denis Sullivan is a replica three-masted, wooden, gaff rigged schooner originally from Milwaukee, Wisconsin. She was a flagship of both the state of Wisconsin and of the United Nations Environment Programme until she was sold to the World Ocean School and moved to Boston, Massachusetts in late 2022.

History
The construction of the Denis Sullivan was first proposed in 1991 by a group of Milwaukee residents and volunteers from other states. Their plan was to build a tall ship which would serve as a platform for educating people about the Great Lakes. Community involvement was welcome in the project, and almost a thousand people donated almost a million volunteer hours toward the Denis Sullivan construction. Through the efforts of both professional shipwrights and volunteers, the Denis Sullivan was partially completed and launched in June 2000. She departed Milwaukee for her first sail to the Caribbean in November 2000.

Folk singer Pete Seeger recorded a song called "The Schooner Denis Sullivan" in 2001.

In September 2022 the Denis Sullivan was sold to the World Ocean School in Boston, Massachusetts. The ship departed Milwaukee under motor for Boston on October 8, 2022. Despite the transaction Milwuakee was still listed as her official homeport for traditional purposes.

Design
The Denis Sullivan is not a replica of a specific vessel. Rather, her design is inspired by that of the Great Lakes cargo schooners of the 19th century. Like many of those schooners, she carries a raffee, a square-rigged fore topsail which is triangular in shape.

In designing the Denis Sullivan, architects Timothy Graul Marine Services looked to several nineteenth century Great Lakes schooners for inspiration, including the Rouse Simmons, Clipper City, and Alvin Clark. Above the waterline, the Sullivan closely resembles these earlier vessels. Her shape is that of an efficient cargo carrier, and her rigging and deck arrangement are likewise authentic. She differs from her predecessors, however, below the waterline. Traditionally, Great Lakes cargo schooners were built with a fairly flat bottom to minimize draft and permit sailing in shallow waters. They carried a centerboard to compensate for this when sailing to windward. The Denis Sullivan strayed from this tradition to meet both modern Coast Guard safety requirements and the practical considerations of a passenger vessel. An additional concession to safety regulations was the division of the traditional cargo hold into watertight bulkheads.

See also
 List of schooners

References

Schooners
Tall ships of the United States
Sailing ships of the United States
Three-masted ships
Individual sailing vessels
Wisconsin culture
2000 ships
Museum ships in Wisconsin
Museums in Milwaukee